The Great War is a 2017 American documentary film directed by Stephen Ives, Amanda Pollak and Rob Rapley.  It is based on World War I (1914–18) and focuses especially on the United States' 20-month experience (April 1917 – November 1918) of deploying to the European theater.

The film premiered to coincide with the centennial anniversary of the United States entry into the war on April 6, 1917.  The three-part film aired on the PBS network series American Experience during April 10–12, 2017.

See also
 World War One - CBS production (1964–65)
 The Great War - BBC, Canadian Broadcasting Corporation, and Imperial War Museums co-production (1964)
 The World at War - Thames Television production (1973)
 The Great War and the Shaping of the 20th Century - BBC and KCET co-production (1996)

References

2017 documentary films
2017 American television episodes
2017 television films
2017 films
American documentary television films
American Experience
Documentary television series about World War I
2010s American films